Sedoanalgesia is the practice of combining sedation with local anesthesia, usually in the case of surgery. In medical studies, administering sedoanalgesia has been shown to be cost- and time-effective when compared to general or regional anesthesia, and it can reduce the amount of nursing staff, anesthetists, and equipment required for a given procedure. Frequently used in patients who present with considerable risk from conventional anesthesia and with elderly patients with co-morbid medical conditions.


Medical Uses
Used in endoscopic gastrointestinal procedures, dental procedures, and minimally invasive surgeries.

References

External links
 Sedoanalgesia (discusses use in dental procedures)
 (ABSTRACT) Sedoanalgesia in urology: a safe, cost-effective alternative to general anaesthesia. A review of 1020 cases
 Patients’ satisfaction with sedoanalgesia versus subarachnoid analgesia in endourology
 (PDF) Sedoanalgesia in pediatric daily surgery
 Sedo-Analgesia in Neurologically Ill Patients: Guidelines Revisited
 Concepts Of Interest

Anesthesia
Pain management